Mete Gazoz (born 8 June 1999 in Istanbul) is a Turkish recurve archer. He won the gold medal in the men's individual event at the 2020 Summer Olympics held in Tokyo, Japan. He also represented Turkey at the 2016 Summer Olympics held in Rio de Janeiro, Brazil.

Sports career
Gazoz began with Archery in 2010. The right-handed archer made his international debut in 2013.

He won the silver medal in the Recurve Junior Men Team event at the 2013 World Archery Youth Championships in Wuxi, China. He participated in the 2014 Summer Youth Olympics in Nanjing, China, in the 2015 European Games in Baku, Azerbaijan, and in the 2015 World Archery Championships in Copenhagen, Denmark. Gazoz won the silver medal in the Recurve Cadet Men event at the European Youth Cup Circuit 2015 in Klagenfurt, Austria, and another silver medal in the Recurve Junior Men Team event at the 2016 World Indoor Archery Championships in Ankara, Turkey.

Gazoz won his first match on 8 August 2016 in the  2016 Rio Olympics at 1/32 tour against the French Pierre Plihon, with a score of 6–5. At his second match, 1/16 tour, he lost the game 3–7 against the Dutch Sjef Van den Berg.

He won the bronze medal in the Junior Mixed Team event with his teammate Yasemin Anagöz at the 2017 World Archery Youth Championships in Rosario, Santa Fe, Argentina. 

He claimed the silver medal in the Junior Men's individual event at the 2018 World Indoor Archery Championships held in Yankton, South Dakota, United States.

He won the gold medal in individuals 70m category during the 2018 Mediterranean Games held in Tarragona, Spain.

Mete Gazoz won gold in men's individual archery at Tokyo Olympic Games, bringing his country its first-ever Olympic medal in archery. “I’m feeling great. It’s amazing to be here, it’s amazing to have a gold medal at the Olympics. After 2016, after Rio, I promised myself I would be Olympic Champion next time in Tokyo,” said Gazoz. Gazoz, who defeated Luxembourg's Jeff Henckels in the first round match held on Thursday at the Yumenoshima Archery Field, and Australian Ryan Tyack in the second round match, had advanced to the last 16. He advanced to the quarterfinals by knocking off Australian Taylor Worth in the round of 16 in the morning session. Gazoz eliminated Brady Ellison of the United States, who is ranked number 1 in the world rankings, to book his spot in the semifinals. In the semis, Gazoz defeated Japan's Takaharu Furukawa to advance to the final. Here he competed against Italy's Mauro Nespoli. Gazoz won the match 6-4 and bagged the gold medal.

He won the bronze medal in the men's individual recurve event at the 2022 European Archery Championships held in Munich, Germany.

References

External links
 

Turkish male archers
Living people
Place of birth missing (living people)
1999 births
Archers at the 2015 European Games
Archers at the 2014 Summer Youth Olympics
European Games competitors for Turkey
Archers at the 2016 Summer Olympics
Olympic archers of Turkey
Competitors at the 2018 Mediterranean Games
Competitors at the 2022 Mediterranean Games
Mediterranean Games gold medalists for Turkey
Mediterranean Games silver medalists for Turkey
Mediterranean Games bronze medalists for Turkey
Mediterranean Games medalists in archery
Archers at the 2019 European Games
Archers at the 2020 Summer Olympics
Medalists at the 2020 Summer Olympics
Olympic gold medalists for Turkey
Olympic medalists in archery
Islamic Solidarity Games medalists in archery
21st-century Turkish people